All Rounder is a 1984 Indian Hindi-language film directed and produced by Mohan Kumar. It stars Kumar Gaurav and Rati Agnihotri in pivotal roles.

Cast

 Kumar Gaurav as Ajay Kumar
 Rati Agnihotri as Ritu 
 Vinod Mehra as Birju
 Ramesh Deo as Cricket Boardperson 
 Shakti Kapoor as Vikram
 Shubha Khote as Moushiji
 Paintal as Tailor 
 Ashalata Wabgaonkar as Ritu's aunt
 Raju Desai as Young Birju 
 Sujit Kumar as Ritu's dad
 Yunus Parvez as Cricket Board Chair 
 Anuradha Patel as Vikram's Girlfriend
 Shivraj as Manager of vikram property

Soundtrack
Lyrics: Anand Bakshi

References

External links

 Cult of Kumar

1980s Hindi-language films
1984 films
Films scored by Laxmikant–Pyarelal
Films directed by Mohan Kumar